is a Japanese politician serving as the Governor of Niigata Prefecture, following his election in June 2018. Prior to his election, Hanazumi served as a vice commandant in the Japan Coast Guard and as Vice Governor of Niigata.

Governor of Niigata 
In the race to become Niigata's governor, Hanazumi was backed by the ruling Liberal Democratic Party (LDP) and Komeito, in a face-off against opposition-backed candidate Chikako Ikeda. Throughout his campaign, Hanazumi tried to distance himself from the ruling coalition, in a bid to gain support from a wider range of voters. The ruling coalition has faced allegations of favoritism involving two school operators. In the election, Hanazumi defeated Ikeda by a narrow 3.4% margin.

In contrast to the pro-nuclear policies of the LDP and Komeito, Hanazumi vowed to maintain a cautious approach to the restart of the Kashiwazaki-Kariwa Nuclear Power Plant, effectively following the policy of his opposition-supported predecessor.

He was re-elected in the 2022 Niigata gubernatorial election.

References

External links 
  

Governors of Niigata Prefecture
Politicians from Niigata Prefecture
University of Tokyo alumni
1958 births
Living people